Lynn Wells was a civil rights activist in Atlanta, Georgia during the 1960s and was a member of the Student Nonviolent Coordinating Committee (SNCC), the Southern Student Organizing Committee (SSOC), and then a national leader of Students for a Democratic Society and the Revolutionary Youth Movement in the late 1960s.

Today, She is now the Director of the Cooleemee Historical Association and the mayor of Cooleemee, North Carolina.

References

Activists for African-American civil rights
Living people
Year of birth missing (living people)